Kheyrabad (also Romanized as Kheyrābād and Khaīrābād) is a village in Shur Dasht Rural District, Shara District, Hamadan County, Hamadan Province, Iran. At the 2006 census, its population was 654, in 124 families.

References 

Populated places in Hamadan County